Mozambique competed at the 2022 Commonwealth Games at Birmingham, England from 28 July to 8 August 2022. It was Mozambique's seventh appearance at the Games.

Caio Lobo and Alcinda Panguana were the country's flagbearers during the opening ceremony.

Medalists

Competitors
The following is the list of number of competitors participating at the Games per sport/discipline.

Athletics

Men
Track and road events

Women
Track and road events

Boxing

Judo

A squad of three judoka was entered as of 6 July 2022.

Swimming

Men

Women

Triathlon

Individual

References

External links
Birmingham 2022 Commonwealth Games Official site

Nations at the 2022 Commonwealth Games
2022
2022 in Mozambican sport